East Hollywood High School (EHHS) is an accredited public charter school in West Valley City, Utah, United States. It specializes in film production training for students grades 9–12.  As of 2013, the school principal is Katrina Walker. Chartered directly through the Utah State Office of Education, EHHS enrolls approximately 350 students each year.

Academics

The student body is fewer than 350 and average class sizes are smaller than 25 students.

Many students take advantage of the school's Concurrent Enrollment partnership with Snow College, through which they can receive college credit without leaving EHHS.

Three Period Day 
Students at East Hollywood take only three classes at a time.  Allowing them to focus their attention and participate in project based learning.  Classes are approximately two hours daily.  Each grading term is only six weeks long with six grading periods per school year.   

This schedule provides many benefits:  

 Students can earn 9 credits in a school year. 
 Extended time in class allows students to complete schoolwork in class while the teachers provide individual support. 
 Only three classes to focus on at a time prevents students from becoming overwhelmed with too many teachers and assignments. 
 Teachers know each student and their individual needs because they teach fewer students at a time with only three classes.
 Six week terms prevents students from falling too far behind and they are generally able to catch up quickly. 
 Six grading periods allows student the opportunity for a fresh start every six week.

Programs 

 Film
 Special Effects Makeup
 Music Composition and Sound Recording
 Visual Arts
 Career and Technical Education: Business and Marketing, Hospitality and Tourism, Family and Consumer Sciences, Video/Audio Production
 Free Credit Recovery 
 Specialized Instruction
 Advisory
 Athletics
 Snow College Live Interactive Concurrent Enrollment
 Night School

Clubs and organizations
Skills USA
DECA
FCCLA

Arts

Film

In previous years, film production classes have produced a weekly school news program. The weekly news program is no longer being produced.

School film projects include:

 2008-2009 Shakespeare's Macbeth
 2009-2010 Shakespeare's Much Ado About Nothing 
 2010-2011 Shakespeare's Hamlet
2011-2012 Paradise High 
2012-2013 Backup Copy: A Paradise High Film
2013-2014 Step Larpers: A Quest for Unity
2015-16 Benevolent Boys
2017-18 Worst Prom Ever 
2019-20 Graduation Sucks

External links
East Hollywood High School website

References

Public high schools in Utah
Charter schools in Utah
Schools in Salt Lake County, Utah
Buildings and structures in West Valley City, Utah